Anglican & Episcopal History is a peer reviewed journal published quarterly (March, June, September, and December) by the Historical Society of the Episcopal Church.

History
Established in 1932 as the Historical Magazine of the Protestant Episcopal Church and published by the Church Historical Society, the predecessor organization of the Historical Society of the Episcopal Church which also gave rise to the National Episcopal Historians and Archivists (NEHA)
, it retained its original name until the current title was adopted with the issue of March 1987 (vol. LVI, no. 1).

In 2007, Anglican & Episcopal History had a circulation of about 750 copies. The journal added electronic publication in December 2018. Past issues are available on JSTOR.

The Journal of the Historical Society of the Episcopal Church is a Member of the Conference of Historical Journals.

Lists of Editors
Editors in Chief
 E. Clowes Chorley, 1932-1949
 Walter Herbert Stowe, 1950-1961
 Lawrence L. Brown, 1962-1977
 John F. Woolverton, 1978-2007
 Edward L. Bond, 2007-June 2021
 Sheryl Kujawa-Holbrook, June 2021-present

Book Review Editors
 William A. Clebsch, 1961-1966
 Frank E. Sugeno, 1967-1976
 J. Carleton Hayden, 1976-1984
 J. Barrett Miller, 1984-?
 James E. Bradley, ?-2010
 Sheryl Kujawa-Holbrook, 2010-present

Church Review Editor
 David L. Holmes, 1987-2003
 Alan L. Hayes, 2003-2011
 J. Barrington Bates, 2011–present

References

Sources
 Anglican & Episcopal History, (December 2007), vol. 76, no. 4.

External links
 Website of Anglican & Episcopal History
 Back issues available on JSTOR, free to read with registration. Volumes 56 (1987)- Volume 85 (2016).

1932 establishments in Texas
Episcopal Church (United States)
Magazines established in 1932
Magazines published in Austin, Texas
Quarterly magazines published in the United States
Religion history journals
Religious magazines published in the United States